Cymothoe meridionalis is a butterfly in the family Nymphalidae. It is found in the Democratic Republic of the Congo.

Subspecies
Cymothoe meridionalis meridionalis (Democratic Republic of the Congo: south to southern Kabinda and western Lualaba)
Cymothoe meridionalis ghesquierei Overlaet, 1944 (Democratic Republic of the Congo: east to Maniema and Tshopo)

References

Butterflies described in 1944
Cymothoe (butterfly)
Endemic fauna of the Democratic Republic of the Congo
Butterflies of Africa